The Lehbach, in its upper reaches also called Spalbach, is a right-hand tributary of the Ruwer in the county of Trier-Saarburg in the German state of Rhineland-Palatinate.
Its GKZ is 26562.

See also
List of rivers of Rhineland-Palatinate

References

External links 
 Geoportal Wasser Rheinland-Pfalz

Rivers of Rhineland-Palatinate
Rivers of Germany